John Watson (born 2 May 1942) is a Welsh footballer who played as a full back in the Football League for Chester.

References

1942 births
Living people
People from Ruabon
Sportspeople from Wrexham County Borough
Welsh footballers
Everton F.C. players
Chester City F.C. players
Oswestry Town F.C. players
English Football League players
Association football fullbacks